Shaven Sean Paul (born 11 March 1991) is a Jamaican international footballer who plays for Portmore United, as a goalkeeper.

References

1991 births
Living people
Jamaican footballers
Jamaica international footballers
Highgate United F.C. (Jamaica) players
Portmore United F.C. players
Association football goalkeepers
National Premier League players
Barbican F.C. players